Viktor Ivanovich Teslia is a former pair skater for the Soviet Union. With Nelli Chervotkina, he is the 1979 Prague Skate champion, 1982 Skate America bronze medalist, and 1983 Winter Universiade champion. Their coaches were Ludmila Velikova and Aleksandr Vlasov.

Teslia moved to England in the 1990s after being hired as a skating coach in Chelmsford. In the 1998–99 season, he coached British men's champion Clive Shorten and the pairs' silver and bronze medalists, Katie Wenger / Daniel Thomas and Sarah Kemp / Michael Aldred. As of August 2016, he is a Level 3 coach in the U.K. His son, Kiril, was born in the late 1980s.

Competitive highlights 
With Chervotkina

References 

Figure skating coaches
Soviet male pair skaters
Living people
Russian emigrants to the United Kingdom
Figure skaters from Saint Petersburg
Universiade medalists in figure skating
Year of birth missing (living people)
Universiade gold medalists for the Soviet Union
Competitors at the 1983 Winter Universiade